M2 — is a Ukrainian music television channel. M2 belongs to media holding Starlight Media, which also comprises channels ICTV, STB, Novyi Kanal, M1 and QTV.

The channel began broadcasting in 2007. On November 1, 2014 together with M1 channel starts to broadcast in widescreen (16:9). Since May 1, 2015 broadcast only Ukrainian music and the product that is created by the Ukrainians.

See also
 Television in Ukraine

References

Television stations in Ukraine
Ukrainian-language television stations in Ukraine